Arkansas Highway 133 (AR 133, Hwy. 133) is a designation for three state highways in South Arkansas. One route of  runs from Louisiana Highway 142 north through Crossett to Highway 8 near Fountain Hill. A second segment runs from Highway 160 north to US Route 425 (US 425) at Lacey. A third segment begins in Rison at Highway 35 and runs north to Highway 54 south of Pine Bluff.

Route description

Louisiana to Highway 8
The route begins at Louisiana Highway 142 at the Louisiana state line and runs north through rural Ashely County. It passes by three properties on the National Register of Historic Places (NRHP) near the Arkansas Forest Commission building: Crossett Experimental Forest Building No. 2, Building No. 6, and Building No. 8. Entering Crossett the highway becomes Main Street and passes by several properties on the National Register including the Municipal Auditorium, Municipal Building, Methodist Church, and Post Office. Highway 133 also has a junction with Highway 133 Truck, which gives access to US 82 as a truck route through Crossett. The highway intersects US 82, forming a concurrency east for five blocks.

After the concurrency ends Highway 133 continues north to North Crossett where it meets Highway 133 Spur near an industrial area and Highway 52. The highway continues through wooded areas as an alternating passing lane highway, including a junction  Highway 189 near Old Milo. Continuing north the route terminates at Highway 8 near Fountain Hill.

Highway 160 to US 425
Highway 133 begins at Highway 160 west of Fountain Hill and runs northeast through heavily forested country. The route terminates at US 425 at Lacey in south Drew County. Highway 133 does not have any intersections with other state highways between its termini. Traffic counts from the Arkansas State Highway and Transportation Department (AHTD) from 2010 indicate that this segment of state highway averages 360 vehicles per day (VPD).

Rison to Highway 53
The highway begins in Rison at Highway 35 near the Rison Cities Service Station. Highway 133 runs north as Magnolia Street past the Hall Morgan Post 83, American Legion Hut and the Cleveland County Courthouse before exiting Rison to the northeast. Winding northeast through forested land the route enters Jefferson County and terminates at Highway 54.

Traffic counts from the AHTD from 2010 show that an average of 890 vehicles per day use Highway 133 in the city limits of Rison. The traffic average drops once outside of town, as low as 750 VPD near the northern terminus.

Major intersections
Mile markers reset at concurrencies.

|-
| align=center colspan=4 |  concurrency east, 
|-

|-
| align=center colspan=5 | Highway 133 begins at Highway 160
|-

|-
| align=center colspan=6 | Highway 133 begins in Rison
|-

Crossett truck route

Running as Florida Street the highway begins at Highway 133 and ends at US 82.

Major intersections

North Crossett spur

Its southern terminus is at Highway 133 and the route runs north through an industrial park to Wood Street.

Major intersections

See also

 List of state highways in Arkansas

References

External links

133
Transportation in Ashley County, Arkansas
Transportation in Cleveland County, Arkansas
Transportation in Drew County, Arkansas
Transportation in Jefferson County, Arkansas